Funland Amusement Park is a small amusement park located in Burns Park, North Little Rock, Arkansas. The park features several small family rides including a Ferris wheel and a train.

Rides
 Train
 Eli Bridge Lil Eli Wheel Ferris wheel
 Sellner Tilt-A-Whirl (no longer at the park)
 Eli Bridge Scrambler (no longer at the park)
 Butterfly
 Carousel
 Helicopters
 Car Carousel
 Space Shuttle
 Wildcat Mini Coaster
 Tubs of Fun
 Zamperla Mini Jets

References

External links
 

Buildings and structures in North Little Rock, Arkansas
Amusement parks in Arkansas
Tourist attractions in North Little Rock, Arkansas